Sirnapally Waterfalls, Janaki Bai Waterfalls or Telangana Niagara Waterfalls are located at Sirnapally village in Indalwai Mandal. It is 20 kilometres from Nizamabad, Telangana.

History 
Sirnapally Rani or Seelam Janaki Bai of Siranapally Dynasty was a landlord family and owned thousands of acres in the pre-independence era. Seelam Janaki built a pond that flows into Ramadugu Project. She constructed multiple ponds, including Manchippa Cheruvu (Pond) for drinking water.

Seelam/Sheelam Raja Ramalinga Reddy and Rani Janaki Bai were landlords in Sirnapally village. Their son Seelam Rram Boopal Reddy was a retired IAS officer. 

A great granddaughter of Janaki Bai is Anuradha Reddy, who became the convenor for the Indian National Trust for Culture and Heritage chapter of Hyderabad.

References 

Nizamabad, Telangana
Waterfalls of Telangana
Nizamabad district